Kulbir Singh, (born 12 April 1980) popularly known by the name Kulbir Singh Zira, is an Indian politician. An elected Member of Legislative Assembly from Zira, district Ferozepur, Punjab to the Punjab Legislative Assembly he is also the Elected Vice President of the Punjab Youth Congress, the youth division of Indian National Congress. In May 2017, he got elected as an MLA .

Electoral performance

References

State cabinet ministers of Punjab, India
Indian National Congress politicians
Punjab, India MLAs 2017–2022
1980 births
Living people
Indian National Congress politicians from Punjab, India